Grandicrepidula collinae is a species of sea snail, a marine gastropod mollusk in the family Calyptraeidae, the slipper snails or slipper limpets, cup-and-saucer snails, and Chinese hat snails.

Description

Distribution
This species is distributed in the Pacific Ocean along New Zealand.

References

 Marshall B.A. 2003. A review of the Recent and Late Cenozoic Calyptraeidae of New Zealand (Mollusca: Gastropoda). The Veliger 46(2): 117-144
 Bouchet, P.; Fontaine, B. (2009). List of new marine species described between 2002-2006. Census of Marine Life.
 Spencer, H.; Marshall. B. (2009). All Mollusca except Opisthobranchia. In: Gordon, D. (Ed.) (2009). New Zealand Inventory of Biodiversity. Volume One: Kingdom Animalia. 584 pp

External links

Calyptraeidae
Gastropods described in 2003